Corrigan Lake is a lake in western Sudbury District in northwestern Ontario, Canada. It is in the Great Lakes Basin, and lies in the geographic township of Genier.

There are no inflows. The major outflow, at the east, is an unnamed creek to Puswawa Lake, which flows via Puswawa Creek and the Montreal River to Lake Superior.

References

Other map sources:

Lakes of Sudbury District